The 2016 Bank of America 500 was a NASCAR Sprint Cup Series race that was scheduled to be held on October 8, 2016, but was postponed to October 9, 2016, because of Hurricane Matthew, at Charlotte Motor Speedway in Concord, North Carolina. Contested over 334 laps on the 1.5 mile (2.4 km) intermediate speedway, it was the 30th race of the 2016 NASCAR Sprint Cup Series season, fourth race of the Chase, and first race of the Round of 12.

Report

Background

The race was held at Charlotte Motor Speedway, a motorsports complex located in Concord, North Carolina, United States. The complex features a  quad-oval track that hosts NASCAR racing including the prestigious Coca-Cola 600 on Memorial Day weekend, the Sprint All-Star Race, and the Bank of America 500. The speedway was built in 1959 by Bruton Smith and is considered the home track for NASCAR with many race teams located in the Charlotte area. The track is owned and operated by Speedway Motorsports, Inc. (SMI) with Marcus G. Smith (son of Bruton Smith) as track president.

The  complex also features a state-of-the-art quarter mile (0.40 km) drag racing strip, ZMAX Dragway. It is the only all-concrete, four-lane drag strip in the United States and hosts NHRA events. Alongside the drag strip is a state-of-the-art clay oval that hosts dirt racing including the World of Outlaws finals among other popular racing events.

Entry list

First practice

Qualifying

He said afterwards that he "just got to the green a little bit better. The car was too loose the time before. And I got to the green better. It was good in (Turns) 1 and 2; but I felt like I gave up a little something in (Turns) 3 and 4 coming to the checkered. But, I’ve just got to thank all my sponsors and everybody on this team, Chevrolet and Hendrick engines and chassis for everything that they do and for everything that Stewart-Haas (Racing) does. This has just been a fun car to drive today. Hopefully we can get it dialed in race trim.”

Alex Bowman, who qualified second, said he "didn't put the greatest lap together. In (Turns) 1 and 2, we were a little free in (into the corner) and didn't really keep it on the bottom like I needed to. Turns 3 and 4 were really good. It means so much for Hendrick Motorsports to take a chance on me for these races. I'm really thankful to be here. I hate that we didn't get the pole. We were so close. It's definitely my best starting spot by a bunch, but you'd always like that pole."

Qualifying results

Practice (post-qualifying)
Both practice sessions scheduled for Friday following qualifying was cancelled due to rain stemming from Hurricane Matthew.

Race

First half

Under clear blue North Carolina skies, Kevin Harvick led the field to the green flag at 12:05 p.m. He led the first 12 laps before Chase Elliott got a run on him exiting turn 4 and took the lead on lap 13. The first caution flew on lap 25. It was a scheduled competition caution. Five drivers – Aric Almirola, Jeffrey Earnhardt, Matt Kenseth and Paul Menard for their crews being over the wall too soon, and Michael Annett for speeding – were sent to the tail end of the field for the restart.

The race restarted on lap 31. The second caution flew on lap 62 for a two-car wreck in turn 3 that started when Alex Bowman suffered a right-front tire blowout and slammed the wall, as well as Casey Mears, in turn 3. “Blew a tire I guess,” Bowman said. "It’s really unfortunate. I hate it for these Axalta guys. Everybody at Hendrick Motorsports worked so hard. They brought a great race car here, brand new and destroyed it. Really unfortunate, but it’s not anybody’s fault. We didn’t hit anything we just must have run over something." Mears said he "was going into the corner and I saw him come up all of a sudden. I don’t know. It’s too bad he didn’t put us out of our misery there. We were having a rough start of it. We were just kind of hanging on and actually those guys were going by us. They either blew a right-front (tire) or had something come loose or something and came up into us.” Mears went on to finish 40th. Brad Keselowski was sent to the tail end for his crew being over the wall too soon.

The race restarted on lap 71. Kyle Busch made an unscheduled stop from third on lap 90 for a right-front tire "delamination." Kyle Larson made an unscheduled stop a few laps later for the same issue. Green flag stops began on lap 111. Elliott pitted from the lead on lap 115 and handed it to Joey Logano. The third caution of the race flew on lap 117 after Logano suffered a right-front tire blowout and slammed the wall in turn 1. This handed the lead to Jimmie Johnson. Tony Stewart was sent to the tail end of the field for speeding.

The race restarted on lap 125. Denny Hamlin beat Johnson on the restart to take the lead. Harvick was running third when his engine shut off and began to fade on lap 156. He said in the garage that he "thought it was a power issue. So I cycled through everything. By the time I figured out what happened it just shut off. It looks like low oil pressure. I hate it for everybody ... they made some great adjustments today and got our car back where we needed to be to run up front and everything was going fine." The fourth caution of the race flew on the same lap for Logano suffering another right-front tire blowout and slamming the wall in turn 1 again. When asked what the issue was that caused him to wreck twice, he said he didn't "know. Tires are popping. We’re not the only car that had the issue, but we’re the ones that hit the wall when it happen, so that's not the best place to have them go down. We had a fast car. Our car was capable of winning the race. We drove up from 10th and were up to third and running down the leaders, so I felt really good about what we had. I don't know. Things happen. It's part of racing, I guess.”

Second half
The race restarted on lap 162. Johnson drove by Hamlin in turn 3 to retake the lead on lap 177. Another round of green flag stops started on lap 213. Johnson pitted from the lead the following lap and handed it to Ryan Newman. He pitted the next lap and handed the lead to Clint Bowyer. He pitted on lap 219 and the lead cycled back to Johnson. Ricky Stenhouse Jr. was given a pass through penalty for speeding.

Debris on the frontstretch brought out the fifth caution of the race on lap 228.

The race restarted with 98 laps to go. The sixth caution flew with 81 laps to go after A. J. Allmendinger suffered a right-front tire blowout and slammed the wall in turn 2.

The race restarted with 76 laps to go and the seventh caution of the race flew for a multi-car wreck on the frontstretch that started when Martin Truex Jr., wanting to push Austin Dillon ahead of race leader Johnson, got him loose, sent his car down the track and slammed hard into the inside barrier just past the exit of pit road. Elliott braked and swerved to the right to avoid Dillon. Unfortunately, Busch swerved to the left at the same time and hooked him into the wall and was rammed by Ryan Blaney and Paul Menard. After being released from the infield care center, Dillon said he was "fine, it just sucks. We will have to work hard the next two weeks to get the points back. I felt like I got to third gear pretty clean and then the next thing – I feel contact and I am spinning through the grass. It’s part of it and we took two tires there and you know the risk when you get into it. You just hope that doesn’t happen obviously. I got to third without spinning the tires, and I felt like we got contacted.” Elliott said he thought "the No. 3 they stayed out on tires and tried to get some track position. The No. 78 ended up getting him out of shape and then after that I tried to check up. I don't think the No. 18 saw it, got into us and got us turned the wrong way. It happens we just got to go and try to have more runs like that next week.” The race was red-flagged for 10 minutes and 48 seconds.

The race restarted with 69 laps to go. The eighth caution of the race flew for Denny Hamlin losing an engine on the fronstretch with 26 laps to go. Kenseth exited pit road with the race lead.

The race restarted with 18 laps to go. Johnson beat Kenseth on the restart to take the lead and drove on to score the victory.

Post-race

Driver comments
“When you drive for Rick Hendrick and have all the great people at Hendrick Motorsports working for you, there are just so many great people behind us and that support us to make this happen,” Johnson said in victory lane. “We knew we would get back. It was slower than we wanted it to be but to be here today and have this victory is great."

Kenseth said afterwards that his run "was a great second. I think this is one of the toughest tracks there is on the circuit to pass at. It was better during the day than it is at night and that's a good thing, because we had to go to the back twice, so we were able to make up some ground and finish okay.”

Race results

Race summary
 Lead changes: 9 among different drivers
 Cautions/Laps: 8 for 51
 Red flags: 1 for 10 minutes and 49 seconds
 Time of race: 3 hours, 42 minutes and 47 seconds
 Average speed:

Media

Television
NBC covered the race on the television side. Rick Allen, Jeff Burton and Steve Letarte had the call in the booth for the race. Dave Burns, Mike Massaro, Marty Snider and Kelli Stavast will handle pit road on the television side.

Radio
The Performance Racing Network had the radio call for the race, which was simulcast on Sirius XM NASCAR Radio.

Standings after the race

Drivers' Championship standings

Manufacturers' Championship standings

Note: Only the first 16 positions are included for the driver standings.

References

2016 in sports in North Carolina
2016 NASCAR Sprint Cup Series
NASCAR races at Charlotte Motor Speedway
October 2016 sports events in the United States